An intuition pump is a thought experiment structured to allow the thinker to use their intuition to develop an answer to a problem.

In Dennett's work
The term was coined by Daniel Dennett. In Consciousness Explained, he uses the term to describe John Searle's Chinese room thought experiment, characterizing it as designed to elicit intuitive but incorrect answers by formulating the description in such a way that important implications of the experiment would be difficult to imagine and tend to be ignored.

In the case of the Chinese room argument, Dennett considers the intuitive notion that a person manipulating symbols seems inadequate to constitute any form of consciousness, and says that this notion ignores the requirements of memory, recall, emotion, world knowledge, and rationality that the system would actually need to pass such a test. "Searle does not deny that programs can have all this structure, of course", Dennett says. "He simply discourages us from attending to it. But if we are to do a good job imagining the case, we are not only entitled but obliged to imagine that the program Searle is hand-simulating has all this structure—and more, if only we can imagine it. But then it is no longer obvious, I trust, that there is no genuine understanding of the joke going on."

In his 1984 book Elbow Room, Dennett used the term in a positive sense to describe thought experiments which facilitate the understanding of or reasoning about complex subjects by harnessing intuition:

Criticism
Searle's response contends that Dennett fundamentally did not understand the concept of the Chinese room, and that it was intended to illustrate a semantic point. The point illustrated by the Chinese room was not that the system did not constitute any form of consciousness, according to Searle, but that "[the man in the Chinese room] does not understand Chinese at all, because the syntax of the program is not sufficient for the understanding of the semantics of a language, whether conscious or unconscious."

In other scholarship 
Dorbolo defines intuition pumps as thought experiments designed to "transform" thinking in their audience, as opposed simply to posing a philosophical problem. The distinction between intuition pumps and thought experiments in general is not entirely clear, however; some writers use the two terms synonymously. Brendel goes further, distinguishing "bad" intuition pumps that discourage considered reflection from "legitimate" thought experiments permissible in philosophical argument. Dowe suggests that intuition pumps constitute a middle ground between Moorean facts, or propositions that are so obviously true that they refute arguments to the contrary; and conceptual analysis.

See also
 Consciousness
 Philosophy of mind

References

Sources

External links
 
 Dennett, D. C., "Intuition Pumps", pp. 180–197 in Brockman, J., The Third Culture: Beyond the Scientific Revolution, Simon & Schuster, (New York), 1995. 
 Computer Models as "Intuition Pumps"

 </ref>

Thought experiments
1980 introductions